PBPA may refer to:
People Before Profit Alliance, an Irish  political party formed in October 2005
Portland Bight Protected Area, a protected environment of Jamaica